Alan Barnett was a former Grand Prix motorcycle road racer. He competed from 1969 to 1971 in the Grand Prix world championships. His best season was in 1969 when he finished the season in fifth place in the 500cc world championship.

References
 Alan Barnett career statistics at MotoGP.com

Year of birth missing (living people)
Living people
British motorcycle racers
250cc World Championship riders
350cc World Championship riders
500cc World Championship riders
Isle of Man TT riders
Place of birth missing (living people)